The Kičevo-Poreče dialect (Kičevsko-porečki dijalekt) is a member of the central subgroup of the western group of dialects of Macedonian. The dialect is spoken in a vast area in North Macedonia and mainly in the cities Kičevo and Makedonski Brod. It is also native to the villages of the region Poreče, such as Samokov and those around Kičevo. Because of the migration of the population from Poreče, the dialect is spoken in the region of Polog and in the capital Skopje. The Kičevo-Poreče dialect is closely related to the Prilep-Bitola dialect, Gostivar dialect with which they share many common characteristics. This dialect can be found in many books and novels, and one of the more popular is the novel "Milion mačenici" by Risto Krle. The Kičevo-Poreče dialect has a significantly small number of Serbian and Turkish loan words than the Macedonian dialects.

Phonological characteristics

change of the nasal vowel /õ/ with /ɔ/;
change of the vocal /lˌ/ and vocal /rˌ/;
use of the consonant groups шт (št) and жд (žd);
lose of the inter vocal /v/: глава (glava) > глаа (glaa; head).

Morphological characteristics

use of the dative case for personal names: му рече Стојану (mu reče Stojanu; he told to Stojan);
use of the diminutive: дете (dete) > детуле (detule; kid);
use of the suffix -t for third person singular: тој зборува (toj zboruva) >  тој зборуват (toj zboruvat;  he talks);
use of the preposition "v" and "vo" (in);
linking of the prepositions or clitics with the verb: јас ќ’ода (jas ḱ'oda) instead of јас ќе одам (jas ḱe odam; I will go);
losing of the suffix "-m" for first person singular:  јас зборувам (jas zboruvam) > ја зборува (ja zboruva; I talk);
use of "ja" instead "jas" (I);
use of "su" instead "sum" (am):   јас сум (jas sum) > ја су (ja su; I am).

Examples of the dialect
Omarno žeško sonce is a song that is written on Kičevo-Poreče dialect.

Омарно жешко сонце грејт
и никој на земата не смејт
очи да отворит, ура, ура.
И никој на земјата не смејт
очи да отворит, напред, напред.

Ја народ црнејт, таму на брего
и ноќта ангел јасно викаше:
„О, Боже, до кога и до Бога?“
и ноќта ангел јасно викаше:
„О, Боже, до кога и до Бога?“

Omarno žeško sonce grejt
i nikoj na zemjata ne smejt
oči da otvorit, ura, ura.
I nikoj na zemjata ne smejt
oči da otvorit, napred, napred.

Ja narod crnejt, tamu na brego
i noḱta angel jasno vikaše:
„O Bože, do koga i do Boga?“
i noḱta angel jasno vikaše:
„O Bože, do koga i do Boga?“

Poreče dialect
A short story on Poreče dialect:

Kičevo dialect
A short story on Kičevo dialect:

References

See also
 Macedonian language
 Macedonian dialects

Dialects of the Macedonian language
Kičevo Municipality
Makedonski Brod Municipality